The 1999 PBA All-Filipino Cup or known as the 1999 McDonald's-PBA All-Filipino Cup for sponsorship reasons, was the First Conference of the 1999 PBA season. It started on February 7 and ended on June 6, 1999. The tournament is an All-Filipino format, which doesn't require an import or a pure-foreign player for each team.

Format
The following format will be observed for the duration of the conference:
Two-round eliminations; 16 games per team. 8 teams will advance to the Quarterfinals. 
Quarterfinals: top 4 seeded teams will have twice-to-beat advantage
QF1: 1st seed vs. 8th seed
QF2: 2nd seed vs. 7th seed
QF3: 3rd seed vs. 6th seed
QF4: 4th seed vs. 5th seed
Best-of-five Semifinals: winners of each pairings
SF1: QF1 vs. QF4
SF2: QF2 vs. QF3
Third-place match: One-game playoff 
LSF1 vs. LSF2
Finals: Best-of-7 championship series
F1: WSF1 vs. WSF2

Elimination round

Team standings

Eighth seed playoff

Bracket

Quarterfinals

(1) Mobiline vs. (8) Barangay Ginebra 

With a 7–0 start, Mobiline had a losing run to finish the elimination round. Being the #1 seed, they faced the ragtag Barangay Ginebra Kings with a twice to beat advantage.

The Kings managed to keep in step with the Phone Pals throughout the game; with Mobiline leading by one point in the closing seconds, Bal David converted a jump-shot as time expired that caused jubilation at the mostly pro-Ginebra crowd. Asi Taulava broke down and slumped to the bench right after David's game-clinching jumper and booked a flight to the United States the day after the game.

(2) Alaska vs. (7) Purefoods

(3) Tanduay vs. (6) Pop Cola

(4) Shell vs. (5) San Miguel

Semifinals

(2) Alaska vs. (3) Tanduay

(4) Shell vs. (8) Barangay Ginebra

Barangay Ginebra would come up short in their playoffs run as the Zoom Masters swept them in their semifinals series, 3–0. Game 2 had a free-for all bench-clearing brawl that saw punches being thrown; Shell player Jay Mendoza instigated the fight when he elbowed Ginebra's Wilmer Ong. A total of ₱235,000 worth of fines were issued by PBA commissioner Jun Bernardino, the second-greatest amount since the 1990 Finals played ironically, by Shell and Ginebra where Ginebra walked out to hand Shell the championship trophy.

Third-place playoff

Finals

References

External links
 PBA.ph

All-Filipino Cup
PBA Philippine Cup